A confessional state is a state which officially recognises and practices a particular religion, usually accompanied by a public cultus, and at least encourages its citizens to do likewise.

Over human history, many states have been confessional states. This is especially true in countries where Christianity, Islam and Buddhism were the religions of the state. The idea of religious pluralism in modern terms is relatively recent, and until the beginning of the 20th century, many if not most nations had state religions enshrined in their respective constitutions or by decree of the monarch, even if other religions were permitted to practice.

However, there are many examples of large multicultural empires that have existed throughout time where the religion of the state was not imposed on subjected regions. For instance, the Mongol Empire, where Tengrism was the religion of the court, but not imposed on those ruled by the Mongols, the Achaemenid Empire and the Roman Empire before Constantine I, where regional clergies and practices were allowed to dominate as long as offerings were made to Roman Gods and tribute paid to Rome.

Religious minorities are accorded differing degrees of tolerance under confessional states; adherents may or may not have a set of legal rights, and these rights may not be accessible in practice. For example, in medieval Europe Jewish people suffered various degrees of official and unofficial discrimination; during the same period in Islamic states, non-Muslims or dhimmi were legally inferior to Muslims but accorded certain protections.

In Europe, the 1648 Treaty of Westphalia institutionalized the principle of cuius regio, eius religio—that rulers of a state had the right to determine the religion of its subjects. This was in an effort to curb the religious warfare that had wracked Europe after the Protestant Reformation.

United States

Several of the Thirteen Colonies were confessional states, although of different denominations, before the American Revolution; Connecticut remained one until 1818. Other American states required each town or individual to support some religious body, without the state deciding which one; but this was also abolished, the last instance being Massachusetts, which restricted the obligation in 1821 and ended it in 1843.

Modern times
The confessional state is largely gone in the Western World, although in the Middle East, the confessional state still exists, particularly in Lebanon. The form of government known as the Islamic republic is still quite common in the area as well. A number of modern countries have state religions; they usually also allow freedom of religion. An example of such a state is Costa Rica, a Catholic confessional state and Russia is an Orthodox Confesional State.

Relation to theocracy

The Christian publication Patheos counters accusations that Poland is a theocracy by stating that it is in fact a Confessional State.
Other writers view the notion of a Catholic Confessional State as a rhetorical maneuver to avoid calling certain states and policies theocratic.

See also
Confessionalism (religion)
Separation of church and state
Elite religion
Divine rule
State religion

References

Religion and politics
History of Protestantism
Confessionalism